Miconia dielsii is a species of plant in the family Melastomataceae. It is endemic to Ecuador.  Its natural habitat is subtropical or tropical moist montane forests.

References

dielsii
Endemic flora of Ecuador
Near threatened plants
Taxonomy articles created by Polbot